

Keith Redmon is an American film and television, executive and producer, best known for producing the 2015 film The Revenant. The film was nominated for the BAFTA Award for Best Film at the 69th British Academy Film Awards, the Academy Award for Best Picture at the 88th Academy Awards, and Producers Guild of America Award for Best Theatrical Motion Picture at the Producers Guild of America Awards 2015.

Filmography 
He was a producer in all films unless otherwise noted.

Film 

Thanks

Television

References

External links 
 
 

Living people
American film producers
American television producers
Filmmakers who won the Best Film BAFTA Award
Year of birth missing (living people)